Kent Eger (born February 18, 1981) is a Canadian professional golfer who plays on the Canadian Tour and Gateway Tour. Eger was born in Regina, Saskatchewan, Canada and currently resides in Scottsdale, Arizona.

Junior and amateur golf
Eger had success as a junior golfer in Saskatchewan, winning the 1999 Saskatchewan Junior Boys Championship, before moving to British Columbia to further his golf career. Eger played out of the Radium Resort in Radium Hot Springs, British Columbia, where he represented British Columbia on two Willingdon Cup teams, and played in four Canadian Amateur Championships.

Professional career

Gateway Tour
Eger turned professional in 2006, and began playing competitively on the Gateway Tour in Phoenix, Arizona. He has played there for four seasons, and has won five tournaments.

Canadian Tour
In 2008, Eger joined the Canadian Tour on a full-time basis, and was named Canadian Rookie of the Year. Eger's debut season included a win at the 2008 Seaforth Country Classic, where his score of 26-under-par was one shot shy of the Canadian Tour's all-time scoring record held by Tim Clark, but did set an overall Canadian Tour low record 72-hole score of 258. Two years later, Eger won his second Canadian Tour tournament at the same event, the 2010 Seaforth Country Classic.

Other achievements
In 2008, Eger successfully made it through the first two stages of the PGA Tour Qualifying School and reached the final stage, where he obtained conditional status on the 2009 Nationwide Tour. Being low on the priority list, he only played in two Nationwide Tour events in 2009, missing the cut at both the Wayne Gretzky Classic and the Mexican PGA Championship.

Eger was one of 11 contestants on Big Break Indian Wells, which began screening in hour-long weekly installments on the Golf Channel on May 16, 2011. The winner gained an exemption into the PGA Tour's 2012 Zurich Classic of New Orleans, along with an array of monetary prizes and endorsements, totaling over $50,000. Eger lost in the finale of the competition to fellow countryman David Byrne.

Professional wins (7)

Canadian Tour wins (2)

Gateway Tour wins (5)
 2006 Desert Summer Tournament #12 (Talking Stick Golf Club)
 2007 Desert Spring Tournament #1 (Vista Verde)
 2007 Desert Summer Tournament #12 (Raven Golf Club at Verrado)
 2008 Desert Spring Tournament #5 (Lone Tree Golf Club)
 2010 Q School Challenge #4 (The Club at Prescott Lakes)

References

External links

Profile on the Gateway Tour's official site

Canadian male golfers
Golfing people from Saskatchewan
Golfers from Scottsdale, Arizona
Sportspeople from Regina, Saskatchewan
1981 births
Living people